Álex Raúl Rodríguez Ledezma (born 5 August 1990) is a Panamanian footballer who plays as a goalkeeper, most recently for AD San Carlos.

Club career
The tall Rodríguez joined San Francisco from Sporting San Miguelito in summer 2015.

Rodrígue joined San Carlos on 30 January 2019.

International career
He made his debut for Panama in a January 2013 friendly match against Guatemala and has, as of 1 August 2015, earned a total of 2 caps, scoring no goals. He was a non-playing squad member at the 2013 CONCACAF Gold Cup.

In May 2018, he was named in Panama's preliminary 35 man squad for the 2018 FIFA World Cup in Russia.

Career statistics

International

References

External links

1990 births
Living people
Sportspeople from Panama City
Panamanian footballers
Panama international footballers
Association football goalkeepers
Sporting San Miguelito players
San Francisco F.C. players
Liga Panameña de Fútbol players
A.D. San Carlos footballers
Expatriate footballers in Costa Rica
2013 Copa Centroamericana players
2013 CONCACAF Gold Cup players
Copa América Centenario players
2017 Copa Centroamericana players
2017 CONCACAF Gold Cup players
2018 FIFA World Cup players
Municipal Pérez Zeledón footballers